Most major parties launched gubernatorial candidates for the 2006 elections in Rio Grande do Sul:

 PMDB: Incumbent governor Germano Rigotto in coalition with the PTB, which provided vice-gubernatorial candidate Sonia Santos. Rigotto finished third.
 PT: Former governor and Minister for the Cities Olívio Dutra in coalition with PC do B, which provided as vice-gubernatorial candidate the state deputy Jussara Cony. Olívio lost in the second round of vote.
 PSDB: Federal deputy and former Minister of Planning Yeda Crusius, in coalition of PPS, PFL and many smaller parties. Ms. Crusius won the election after a run-off.
 PDT: Federal deputy and former governor Alceu Collares
 PP: Former Minister for the Agriculture Francisco Turra
 Other parties to field candidates include PSOL, PSB, PCO, and PV.

Opinion polls
Porto Alegre newspaper Correio do Povo published on 15 July 2006 an opinion poll with the following results:

 Germano Rigotto: 28.1%
 Olívio Dutra: 20.8%
 Yeda Crusius: 14.5%
 Alceu Collares: 9.6%
 Francisco Turra: 4.2%

A new poll was published by Correio do Povo on 23 September 2006:

 Germano Rigotto: 29.2%
 Olívio Dutra: 23.4%
 Yeda Crusius: 19.7%
 Francisco Turra: 6.0%
 Alceu Collares: 4.5%

In the end, Mr. Rigotto finished the first round in the third place, opening the way for a run-off between Crusius and Dutra, which the PSDB candidate won.

References

2006 Brazilian gubernatorial elections
October 2006 events in South America
Rio Grande do Sul gubernatorial elections